After We Collided is a 2020 American romantic drama film directed by Roger Kumble, and written by Anna Todd and Mario Celaya. Based on the 2014 novel of the same name by Todd, it is the sequel to After (2019) and the second overall installment in the After film series. The film stars Josephine Langford and Hero Fiennes Tiffin reprising their roles as Tessa Young and Hardin Scott, respectively, with Dylan Sprouse, Shane Paul McGhie, Candice King, Khadijha Red Thunder, Inanna Sarkis, Samuel Larsen, and Selma Blair in supporting roles.

After We Collided premiered in select territories on September 2, 2020, before being released simultaneously in theaters and video-on-demand in the United States on October 23, 2020, by Open Road Films. Like its predecessor, the film received overwhelmingly negative reviews from critics, with many criticizing the plot, characters, acting and glamourized portrayal of toxic relationships. Despite this, it was a box-office success, grossing $48 million worldwide.

The film was followed by a number of sequels including, After We Fell in September 2021, and After Ever Happy in September 2022. A fifth installment titled After Everything is currently in post-production, while a prequel and additional sequel centered around the children of the series' main characters are also in development.

Plot
One month after his breakup with Tessa Young, Hardin Scott meets an unknown homeless man, whom he rebuffs after the man tries to ask him a question. On her first day as an intern at Vance Publishing, Tessa shares an awkward encounter with coworker Trevor Matthews. Impressed with her work, Vance's owner Christian Vance takes Tessa, Trevor, and his secretary and girlfriend Kimberly to a Seattle-area work event. At a nightclub, Tessa and Trevor network with and impress a businessman considering an investment in Vance. Tessa drunk-dials Hardin, compelling him to track her down. He arrives at her hotel room to find a half-dressed Trevor (whose clothes were drying after Tessa accidentally spilt wine on them). Hardin kicks Trevor out of the room, and Tessa fights with Hardin before the two have sex.

The next morning, Hardin and Tessa fight again before Tessa and Trevor leave with Vance, who informs his interns that he has secured financing from the businessman. Tessa and Hardin each come to regret their decision to end their relationship. When Tessa returns to the apartment she shared with Hardin to retrieve some belongings, Hardin steps into the apartment with his mother Trish, who assumes the two are still dating. Tessa plays along and finds that she enjoys spending time with Hardin and Trish, who reveals to Tessa the source of Hardin's personality issues: he is traumatized after watching Trish get violently raped by men to whom his father Ken owed money. On the following day, her birthday, Tessa visits her mother Carol's house and encounters her ex-boyfriend Noah. The two accidentally reveal that Tessa's long-lost father had visited the home in an attempt to see her. Feeling betrayed, Tessa returns to Hardin's apartment and resumes a relationship with him.

On Christmas Day, Hardin, Tessa, and Trish attend a holiday party at Hardin's dad, Ken. Furious at Ken's apparent willingness to forgive himself for his role in the attack on Trish, Hardin gets drunk and attacks Ken. Tessa describes the incident to Trevor, who warns her that her relationship with Hardin will not end well. Vance contacts Tessa to inform her that his company is expanding and moving to Seattle, and offers her a job there. On New Year's Eve, Tessa and Hardin attend a party hosted at a university frat house, where they reconnect with a number of their former college friends. Each misinterprets a conversation held by the other: Tessa assumes Hardin is cheating on her when she sees him asking for the forgiveness of another girl with whom he had previously been involved, and Hardin accidentally learns of Vance's offer and concludes that Tessa will leave him for Trevor. Tessa and Hardin fight, and Tessa storms off. Hardin only sees apologetic texts sent by Tessa the next day after charging his phone. He calls Tessa, and she reaches for her phone while driving and is involved in a car accident that leaves her injured.

Devastated by his indirect responsibility for the accident, Hardin decides ending the relationship, but Trish talks him out of it. He races to Vance's farewell party, where Vance proposes to Kimberly. Tessa fights with Hardin once more before deciding to continue dating him. One night sometime afterwards, the homeless man who spoke to Hardin earlier confronts the two and reveals his identity: he is Tessa's father.

Cast

In addition, Anna Todd, the writer of the source novel and co-writer of the film's  screenplay, has a brief cameo as club patron.

Production
In May 2019, it was confirmed that a sequel to the film After was planned with Josephine Langford and Hero Fiennes Tiffin reprising their roles as Tessa Young and Hardin Scott respectively.

On August 4, it was announced that Roger Kumble would direct the sequel. On August 5, it was announced that Dylan Sprouse was cast as Trevor, Tessa's coworker. On August 15, Charlie Weber, Rob Estes, Louise Lombard, Candice King, Karimah Westbrook and Max Ragone were announced to play Christian Vance, Ken Scott, Trish, Kim, Karen, and Smith, respectively. Estes and Westbrook replaced Peter Gallagher and Jennifer Beals as Ken and Karen Scott respectively.

Principal photography began in August 2019 in Atlanta, Georgia.

Release
After We Collided was theatrically released in Italy, Ireland, Portugal and the United Kingdom on September 2, 2020. On September 3, 2020, the film was released in Austria, Cyprus, Czech Republic, Germany, Greece, Hungary, Slovakia, Spain, Switzerland, and Ukraine. It was then released in Sweden on September 9, in Australia, Denmark, the Middle East and New Zealand on September 10, and in Canada, Estonia, Latvia, Lithuania, Norway, Poland, and Romania on September 11. It was released simultaneously to theaters and on-demand in the United States on October 23, 2020, by Open Road Films. In selected regions, it was released on Netflix on December 22, 2020.

Reception

Box office and VOD
The film debuted to $10 million from 16 countries, with Italy ($2.6 million) being the largest market. In its second weekend, the film grossed $4.2 million from 21 countries, for a 10-day running total of $21 million. In Sweden, the film grossed $295,567 from 122 theaters during the first five days of its theatrical release, beginning on September 9. Following the strong sophomore numbers, it was announced the film would have an increase in the theater totals in several countries, including the United Kingdom where its gross jumped 18% in the second weekend and was being distributed by Shear Entertainment would increase from 59 theaters to 360. In its third weekend the film made $4.1 million from 31 countries. In its fourth weekend, the film earned $3.25 million from 32 countries. In Spain the film earned (€3.2 million) $3.7 million.

In After We Collideds domestic debut, it grossed $422,899 from 460 theaters. Over that same period, it was the number one most rented film on Google Play and Apple TV, and second at FandangoNow. The following weekend it remained first at Google and Apple, while finishing third at both Fandango and Spectrum.

Critical response
On Metacritic, it has a weighted average score of 14 out of 100, based on four critics, indicating "overwhelming dislike."

Sequels

In September 2020 it was announced that two sequels, After We Fell and After Ever Happy, were greenlit to go into back-to-back production, with Castille Landon directing both films. After We Fell was theatrically released on September 30, 2021. After Ever Happy was theatrically released on September 7, 2022.

On August 24, 2022, it was announced that another sequel, titled After Everything, has finished filming. Langford and Fiennes Tiffin are both set to reprise their roles. It will be the fifth and final movie in the After film series. It will also be the only film that will not be based on a book in the series.

Another sequel and prequel are in development.

References

External links
 

2020 films
2020 romantic drama films
2020s English-language films
American romantic drama films
American sequel films
Fan fiction works
Films about couples
Films based on American novels
Films based on romance novels
Films based on works by Anna Todd
Films based on young adult literature
Films directed by Roger Kumble
Films postponed due to the COVID-19 pandemic
Films produced by Anna Todd
Films produced by Aron Levitz
Films produced by Courtney Solomon
Films produced by Jennifer Gibgot
Films produced by Mark Canton
Films produced by Nicolas Chartier
Films scored by Justin Burnett
Films shot in Atlanta
Films with screenplays by Anna Todd
Films with screenplays by Mario Celaya
2020s American films
2020s French films